United Nations Security Council resolution 936, adopted unanimously on 8 July 1994, after reaffirming resolutions 808 (1993) and 827 (1994), the Council appointed Richard Goldstone, a judge at the Constitutional Court of South Africa, as Prosecutor at the International Criminal Tribunal for the former Yugoslavia (ICTY).

See also
 Bosnian War
 Breakup of Yugoslavia
 Croatian War of Independence
 List of United Nations Security Council Resolutions 901 to 1000 (1994–1995)
 Yugoslav Wars

References

External links
 
Text of the Resolution at undocs.org

 0936
 0936
1994 in Yugoslavia
1994 in Bosnia and Herzegovina
1994 in Croatia
 0936
July 1994 events